Shelayevo is a rural locality (a selo) and the administrative center of Shelayevskoye Rural Settlement, Valuysky District, Belgorod Oblast, Russia. The population was 2,233 as of 2010. There are 15 streets.

Geography 
Shelayevo is located 12 km south of Valuyki (the district's administrative centre) by road. Kolykhalino is the nearest rural locality.

References 

Rural localities in Valuysky District